Forgiveness Rock Record is the fourth studio album by Canadian indie rock musical collective Broken Social Scene, released by the Arts & Crafts record label on May 4, 2010. The critically acclaimed album, produced by John McEntire of the bands Tortoise and The Sea and Cake, features guest appearances by Feist, Emily Haines of Metric, Scott Kannberg from Pavement, Sebastien Grainger of Death from Above 1979, and Sam Prekop also of The Sea and Cake.

The album was a shortlisted nominee for the 2010 Polaris Music Prize.

Track listing

Lo-Fi for the Dividing Nights
Lo-Fi for the Dividing Nights is an EP that was available as a digital download with pre-orders of Forgiveness Rock Record. It was also available as a promo CD with purchases of Forgiveness Rock Record at some record stores in Canada and the U.S.

Charts

References

2010 albums
Broken Social Scene albums
Arts & Crafts Productions albums